Siren is the third studio album by Heather Nova, released in 1998.

Critical reception
The Washington Post wrote: "The singer and three different producers have combined folk-rock guitar, discreet synthbeats and lush keyboards and strings into a deftly eclectic contemporary sound. The only time this slick pop-rock doesn't upstage Nova's sensibility, however, is when she's dispensing the breathless come-ons of songs like 'Make You Mine'."

AllMusic concluded that "it's Nova's unique vocal style and winning pop sensibilities that make Siren work as well as it does, doing double duty as substantive singer/songwriter statement and perfect pop-radio product."

Track listing
All songs written by Heather Nova.

"London Rain (Nothing Heals Me Like You Do)" – 3:49
"Blood of Me" – 3:59
"Heart and Shoulder" – 3:58
"What a Feeling" – 4:46
"Valley of Sound" – 4:20
"I'm the Girl" – 5:23
"Winterblue" – 4:56
"I'm Alive" – 3:40
"Widescreen" – 4:19
"Paper Cup" – 3:29
"Avalanche" – 4:07
"Make You Mine" – 4:56
"Ruby Red" – 4:05
"Not Only Human" – 5:06

Australian bonus disc
"Grow Young"
"Water From Wine"
"London Rain" (acoustic)
"Blind"
"Walk This World" (acoustic)

Japan bonus tracks
"Grow Young"
"Water from Wine"
"London Rain" (acoustic)

B-sides
"London Rain" (acoustic)
"Days & Nights"
"The Ship Song" (Nick Cave cover)
"Nothing" 
"Many Rivers to Cross"
"Grow Young"
"Water to Wine"

Personnel

Musicians
Heather Nova – acoustic guitar, violin, vocals
David Ayers – guitar (14)
Marcus Cliffe – bass guitar (4)
Danny Cummings – percussion
Geoff Dugmore – drums
Guy Fletcher – piano, Hammond organ, tamboura, mellotron, Hawaiian guitar, Wurlitzer
Nikolaj Juel – guitar, Moog synthesizer, Fender Rhodes
Nadia Lanman – cello
Monti – drums (2, 5, 8, 9)
John Moore – saw
Paul Sandrone – bass guitar
Satin Singh – percussion
Neil Taylor – guitar
Youth – guitar (6), bass guitar (3, 6, 11)

Production
Jon Kelly, Felix Tod, Youth – producers
Lorraine Francis, Hugo Nicholson, Andrew Scarth – engineers
Anne Dudley, Andy Green, Jon Kelly, Will Malone, Hugo Nicholson, Andy Wallace – mixing
Steve Sisco – mixing assistant
Roger Lian, Howie Weinberg – mastering
Brian Fanning – PQ editing
Jason Mayo, Felix Tod – programming
Mike Diver, Heather Nova – photography
Emma Jones – recording assistant

Charts

Weekly charts

Year-end charts

Singles

References

Heather Nova albums
1998 albums
Albums produced by Jon Kelly
Albums produced by Youth (musician)
V2 Records albums